Axel Tetens (15 December 1892 – 29 April 1961) was a Danish wrestler. He competed at the 1920 and 1924 Summer Olympics.

References

External links
 

1892 births
1961 deaths
Olympic wrestlers of Denmark
Wrestlers at the 1920 Summer Olympics
Wrestlers at the 1924 Summer Olympics
Danish male sport wrestlers
Place of birth missing